Muamer Aljic (born 19 June 2000) is a Bosnian professional footballer who plays as a defender for French club Louhans-Cuiseaux.

Career
A youth product of Saint-Étienne and Lyon, Aljic began his senior career with the academy of Niort. After a loan with Andrézieux for the 2019-20 season, Aljic signed his first professional contract with Clermont on 19 June 2020.. Aljic made his professional debut with Clermont in a 1–1 (4–2) Coupe de France penalty shootout loss to Grenoble Foot 38 on 20 January 2021.

References

External links
 
 ASSE profile
 Clermont FOot Profile

2000 births
Living people
Sportspeople from Tuzla
Bosnia and Herzegovina footballers
French footballers
Bosnia and Herzegovina emigrants to France
French people of Bosnia and Herzegovina descent
Championnat National 2 players
Association football defenders
AS Saint-Étienne players
Olympique Lyonnais players
Chamois Niortais F.C. players
Andrézieux-Bouthéon FC players
Clermont Foot players
Louhans-Cuiseaux FC players